Pierre Bernard, Jr. is an American graphic designer and comedian, most notable for his work on Late Night with Conan O'Brien, The Tonight Show with Conan O'Brien, and Conan.  He had a recurring sketch called "Pierre Bernard's Recliner of Rage", where he would complain about issues that personally concern him while sitting in a recliner. The issues he complains about are typically esoteric in nature and mainly deal with comic books, anime, drawing or science fiction.

Biography
Early in his career, Bernard did comic book lettering for major publishers, including Marvel Comics, DC Comics, Heavy Metal, Gold Key Comics, Playboy, Warren Publishing, and Blackthorne Publishing.

Bernard worked in the advertising and marketing field for such clients as DFS Dorland Worldwide, McCaffrey & McCall, Inc, and Newsweek magazine doing storyboards and comp presentations. At Prudential Securities he did various brochures and eventually took over their in-house magazine.

Bernard was the graphic designer for Conan. On Late Night with Conan O'Brien, Bernard appeared in a recurring sketch called "Pierre Bernard's Recliner of Rage".

Bernard has been a resident of Ewing Township, New Jersey.

Notable appearances

Pierre Bernard's Recliner of Rage

Drawing pens
In one segment, Bernard complained that a certain brand of drawing pen that he enjoyed was discontinued.

Bottle caps
In another segment, Pierre was collecting a certain type of Snapple bottle cap for an art project, only to find that the caps had changed in design.

Robotech
Bernard complained on one segment about the increasing number of Robotech DVDs. This prompted a "response" from robotech.com about the complaint and an offer to send Bernard a free complete collection of the DVDs.

Action figures
This segment sees Bernard complaining about the Justice League Unlimited action figures.

Mallomars
Bernard complains about the seasonal release of the Nabisco snack Mallomars because despite the company's claims that its limited release is due to summer temperature and the difficulty in storing them in such heat, other chocolate covered-related products are still regularly produced and distributed.

Case Closed
Bernard complains about The Cartoon Network putting Case Closed on during Cowboy Bebop'''s usual airtime. He dislikes Case Closed's campy 1970s style tunes compared to Cowboy Bebop's jazzy ones which helped him sleep. Coincidentally, Case Closed's main character takes the assumed first name of Conan in which the host remarks about after the segment.

Stargate SG-1
One segment garnered Bernard a cult following in the Stargate SG-1 community. The initial segment was a complaint that Stargate SG-1 was better without Dr. Daniel Jackson (played by Michael Shanks). Shanks had left SG-1 after the fifth season only to return for the seventh season, and Bernard felt Jackson's involvement with the team averted too many action sequences.

After the SG-1 production team saw the sketch, they were so excited that Bernard gave SG-1 national TV publicity that they offered him an extra role on an episode of SG-1 as a technician named O'Brien (for Conan O'Brien). Bernard's filming process was recorded and aired as a remote segment on Late Night. When asked if he would return for another episode, he showed a clip where his character is shot after he greets an off-screen Dr. Jackson.

He was then invited to an SG-1 convention as a famous guest, which was also recorded and aired as a "remote" on Late Night.

He then appeared in the 200th episode of SG-1, now as a zombied O'Brien, and is shot by a main character. The behind-the-scenes production of this was shown on the May 5, 2006, episode of Late Night with Conan O'Brien.

In 2006, Pierre was interviewed by The Scifi World about his appearances on SG-1.

After the show was canceled, Pierre returned in another segment of Recliner complaining to the Sci Fi Network regarding the show's cancellation. In a later episode of the show, Conan O'Brien allows Pierre to come on the show and rant about the cancellation of Stargate SG-1. In a follow-up sketch to this rant, Conan announced that he would do Pierre a favor by having Jon Lovitz call the Sci Fi Channel to ask programming executive Mark Stern to reverse the cancellation.

Bobblehead collection
After receiving an Empire Today bobblehead doll, Bernard decides to begin a bobblehead doll collection.  However, after ordering 60 bobbleheads, he finds that some were in fact figures in which the head remains stationary and the body bobbles.  Bernard feels strongly that such figures should be accurately labeled as "bobble-body" and not "bobble-head".

Betty Boop figurine
Pierre wanted to buy a 5-foot Betty Boop statue for his living room, but, after being told by a female co-worker that a life-size statue of a cartoon character would severely limit his prospects of keeping a girlfriend, Pierre decided, instead, that he would settle for an 18-inch figurine of Betty Boop which he found particularly alluring as she is dressed up in a black French maid outfit. Unfortunately, the website where he spotted the black-outfitted version of the figurine had completely sold out of them, and, while he found another website selling the French maid Betty Boop figurine, the uniform itself was red, which Pierre doesn't find to be a suitable uniform color for a French maid. He wanted to call the company that made the figurine, Character Collectibles, but he complains that he could not find a phone number anywhere on their website.

Hot Wheels display cases
In a segment that aired on January 11, 2007, Bernard complains about not finding a suitable display case for his Hot Wheels collection, including the famed Arachnorod model. He wants to display the collection in his bathroom, but one case cannot accommodate trucks, and another has distracting hinges.

Anime Network
On the show on April 13, 2007, Pierre expressed his love for Japanese anime and the female voice actors. He stated that he was angry that the East Coast cable providers did not allow him to subscribe to the Anime Network so he could listen to their voices all day.

Dragon Con
On the show on September 5, 2007, Bernard complained about his recent visit to Dragon Con. He described it as an event similar to the more popular Comic Con, but one which Bernard thinks is better.  His complaint involved waiting in numerous lines, not being able to eat his Chick-fil-A meal, and not receiving a badge of the Dragon Con logo he was counting on getting.

Viewmaster Reels
On the April 4, 2008 episode, Bernard eplains he has a new hobby of collecting Viewmaster reels. He says his collection has grown and he has even purchased a camera that allows him to take his own photos to make into custom Viewmaster reels. He complaisn that when he contacted Fisher Price about the blank reels, he was told they no longer make them due to their machine breaking down. Since this makes the reels very rare and expensive, he points to the camera and says, "Fisher Price should FIX the machine that makes the blank reels!"

RedPlum advertisements
On the show on April 11, 2008, Bernard complained about not getting a Best Buy advertisement. He stated that while he receives weekly mailers notifying him of sales in his area, these ads are typically only for grocery stores. He admits that these are sometimes useful, such as when he was notified about a sale on Pop-Tarts. Bernard's complaint, however, is that he never receives notice of sales at high-end stores or stores that specialize in electronics. Bernard specifically mentions Best Buy.  Recently, a special edition DVD of I Am Legend was on sale there. Neighboring areas were made aware of the sale, but he was "left in the dark like a fool". By the time he found out about the sale, the DVD was regular price and had no bonus disk. He called the distributor responsible for his weekly mailer, RedPlum, and was told there was nothing they could do.

Pierre Bernard: Serial Killer
On the show on March 13, 2007, NBC aired a sketch of Conan interviewing Pierre Bernard in a mock news style a la The Today Show or Dateline NBC.  The cause of the interview was Bernard's real life refusal to allow the show to tape a remote segment at his house with his sizeable action figure collection.  Conan contended that this refusal could be explained only by Pierre Bernard being a serial killer.  In the interview Conan asks Bernard questions meant to make Bernard look like a psychotic killer.  Conan's florid interview style was contrasted with Bernard's mostly unemotional responses.  As the interview went on, Bernard gets more into the spirit of the gag and at one point admitted that he did not describe himself as prolific because "I haven't been killing for a long time." The segment ends with Pierre being wheeled onstage in a straitjacket and a face mask in a parody of Hannibal Lecter in The Silence of the Lambs.

Other appearances
Pierre has appeared at other times on Late Night with Conan O'Brien, both as himself and acting as characters. He has portrayed Whoopi Goldberg, the rejected X-Men character Velcroeto, and a character that was supposed to be John Mayer's only black male fan.

As himself, in one of his first appearances (if not the first), he appeared in a sketch where Conan took him, another co-worker, and announcer Joel Godard on a spending spree in New York City, following the recommendation that shopping was the best thing one could do to help the city recover following September 11. In another segment, a parody of NBC's The More You Know segments, Bernard advises high school seniors to hire an escort to avoid the anxiety of finding a prom date. He cautions, however, before spending the money, to make sure she doesn't have a penis. In another early appearance, Pierre was brought out in recognition of his appearance in an NBC or Rockefeller Center newsletter noting his dedication to fitness.

Pierre appeared in a non-recliner sketch on the June 9, 2006 show. In the segment entitled "Prom Primer", he gave nonsensical and humorous advice on going to the prom. On the October 17, 2006 show, Pierre was in a comedy sequence about satellite TV channels. He was also in a bit part on the show a few days after as a part of the recurring gag, "New Fall Characters". In the segment, Pierre was dressed in a diaper and was the African baby that Madonna did not adopt.

Pierre appeared in a bit gag on the show's February 13 airing where he was shown exercising on a stationary bike to test the effects of his sweat on females. This was in response to a then-recent study that claimed that male sweat had aphrodisiac-like effects on women. On the 2007 February 26 show, Pierre was in a skit where he reenacted some select scenes from the then-recent Academy Awards show. It was explained by Conan that the sketch was being done due to NBC being unable to show actual clips of the event. In a "Hannigan the Travelling Salesman" sketch that aired on the Thursday, April 12, 2007 episode of Late Night with Conan O'Brien, Pierre had a cameo as a character dressed in a gym vest and short running shorts named "Gay Haitian Lee", a word-play on PlayStation 3.

During the show's San Francisco excursion in May 2007, Pierre participated in a sketch where he played a San Francisco enthusiast whose calves had grown to enormous proportions walking up the city's hilly streets.

In September 2007, Pierre was flown out to Garnett, Kansas, to appear in a local commercial for "The Sherwood Inn," a local "good ol' down-home-cookin'" restaurant. The entire commercial was aired on Late Night with Conan O'Brien, and when Pierre was asked how much he was paid for the ad he said he was paid "in food." During the bit, Pierre expressed his desire to be in a commercial for the furniture company La-Z-Boy.

He appeared as Senator Barack Obama's arm on an episode that aired June 3, 2008, to commemorate Obama's Democratic presidential nomination, which was confirmed earlier that day.

In March 2010, Bernard made his first appearance since the end of O'Brien's Tonight Show in the YouTube video "Pierre's Unemployed," where he visits a comic convention in Long Beach, California.

In April 2010, Bernard appeared in a Funny or Die sketch named "Asian Conan" as the operator of an illegal child death fighting ring.  He appeared alongside professional stunt coordinator Steven Ho as an Asian version of Conan O'Brien (Who also made frequent appearances on Conan's Tonight) and former Late Night and Tonight Show trombonist Richie "LaBamba" Rosenberg.

The Tonight Show with Conan O'Brien
He appeared on The Tonight Show with Conan O'Brien on June 3, 2009, as a joke with Kareem Abdul-Jabbar.

He appeared on The Tonight Show with Conan O'Brien on November 26, 2009 with Conan O'Brien, associate producer Jordan Schlansky, and Wing Pang celebrating Thanksgiving together at an upscale restaurant.

Conan
He appeared on a 2013 episode of Conan in which he is given a remote entitled "Conan Investigates Pierre Bernard's Creepy Doll Collection".

See also
 Late Night with Conan O'Brien''

References

External links
Totally Graphic official website

"Stargate convention on Conan this week" article at Gateworld.net
Text of the Robotech rant (accessed August 20, 2006)
Text of the Betty Boop figurine rant (accessed November 30, 2006)
Text of the Anime Network rant (accessed April 14, 2007)
Open Letter to Late Night with Conan O'Brien on Robotech.com (accessed August 20, 2006)

African-American artists
American graphic designers
American male television actors
American television personalities
Male television personalities
Living people
People from Ewing Township, New Jersey
Year of birth missing (living people)
21st-century African-American people